Love, So Divine is a 2004 South Korean romantic comedy film starring Ha Ji-won and Kwon Sang-woo, and the directorial debut of Heo In-moo. Released in Korea on August 6, 2004, the film sold over 1,242,476 tickets nationwide.

Plot 
After getting into trouble at their seminary, seminarians Gyu-shik and Seon-dal are sent into the country for a month of service under the elderly Father Nam. Upon their arrival, Gyu-shik meets Father Nam's niece, Bong-hee, who has flown across from the United States to see her boyfriend. However, when her boyfriend ends their relationship, Bong-hee finds herself stranded at her uncle's church with nowhere else to go. At first she and Gyu-shik struggle to get along, but eventually they become attracted to one another, and Gyu-shik is forced to question his commitment to the priesthood.

Cast 
 Kwon Sang-woo as Kim Kyu-shik
 Ha Ji-won as Yang Bong-hee
 Kim In-kwon as Shin Seon-dal
 Kim In-moon as Father Nam
 Kim Seon-hwa as Sister Kim
 Jeon Hye-jin

References

External links 
 
 Love, So Divine at HanCinema

2004 romantic comedy films
2004 films
2000s Korean-language films
Films about religion
South Korean romantic comedy films
2004 directorial debut films
2000s South Korean films